Channel One was a Bangladeshi Bengali-language satellite and cable pay television channel. It applied for a broadcasting license on 5 January 2005, which the Bangladesh Telecommunication Regulatory Commission granted them on 31 January of that year. It started broadcasting on 24 January 2006 from its studio in Uday Tower, Gulshan, Dhaka. It was owned by One Entertainment Limited, a sister concern of One Group. Channel One was an infotainment channel. It ceased broadcasting on 27 April 2010.

Shutdown
In 2006, One Entertainment secured a loan from Prime Bank, pledging the station's broadcasting equipment as collateral. In 2008, the bank called in the loan and, when it was not repaid, sold the equipment at auction to People's Entertainment Ltd. Channel One continued operating, with what the Bangladesh Telecommunication Regulatory Commission (BTRC) found was rented broadcasting equipment, which is a violation of Bangladesh telecommunications law. Consequently, the BTRC shut down the channel on 27 April 2010 at about 6:40pm. Its final transmission was its 6:30pm news bulletin.

See also
 List of television stations in Bangladesh

References

Further reading
 

Television channels in Bangladesh
Television channels and stations established in 2006
Television channels and stations disestablished in 2010
Mass media in Dhaka
Defunct television channels in Bangladesh